is a Japanese retired football player.

Club career stats
Updated to 23 February 2017.

References

External links

Profile at Yokohama FC

1985 births
Living people
Mie Chukyo University alumni
Association football people from Mie Prefecture
Japanese footballers
J2 League players
Sagan Tosu players
Yokohama FC players
Tochigi City FC players
Association football midfielders